"Rock 'n' Roll Kids" is a song by Paul Harrington and Charlie McGettigan that was the winning song of the Eurovision Song Contest 1994, written by Brendan Graham and performed for . The song was Ireland's sixth overall victory, and represented an unprecedented third consecutive time that the same country had won the contest.

There was a myth among Irish media that the song was deliberately chosen not to win. As the contest rules expect the previous year's winner to host the next edition of the contest, the argument runs that the Irish broadcaster was not prepared to do this for a third consecutive year, hence the selection; this has never been proven.

The song, however, won the contest and is popular among Eurovision fans, even being performed in part by McGettigan and Jakob Sveistrup at the Congratulations special in late 2005. It was the first winning song ever to be performed without orchestral accompaniment, as McGettigan's guitar and Harrington's piano were the only instruments needed. It was also the first time in the contest when a song scored over 200 points.

Lyrically, the song originally had seven verses, representing various decades including the '60s, '70s, '80s and '90s but on the advice of a DJ, Graham dropped the last two verses as they felt the song was too long. Graham got the inspiration for the title while attending a Fats Domino concert at Dublin's National Stadium in 1991. He entered it in 1992 and 1993 and it failed to get through both times, but was accepted in 1994. According to Graham, "I saw the song as a small song, as a conversation in the kitchen, and I wanted the listeners to be drawn into that kitchen, and into that conversation".

The song was performed third on the night, following 's CatCat with "Bye Bye Baby" and preceding ' Evridiki with "Ime Anthropos Ki Ego". At the close of voting, it had received 226 points, placing first in a field of 25.

It was succeeded as Irish representative that year by Eddie Friel with "Dreamin'".

To commemorate the 20th anniversary of their victory, Harrington and McGettigan performed a gig in the Sugar Club in Dublin in 2014. Graham reminisced about the inspiration of the song while accepting his Eurovision trophy: "As I stood on the stage at the Point Depot, through the applause and the cheers, I heard a sound roll in over the Liffey Banks – the sound of a rollin', rumbling piano... and for a moment, I wasn't there. I was back in the Stadium on Bourbon Street, on that steamy Dublin night in 1991. Thank you Fats!"

Charts

See also
Following three consecutive Irish victories in the ESC in 1992, 1993, and 1994, writers of the Father Ted comedy series wrote an episode entitled "A Song For Europe" jumping on the idea that RTÉ would pick a song that would lose on purpose.

References

Eurovision songs of Ireland
Eurovision songs of 1994
Eurovision Song Contest winning songs
1994 songs
Songs written by Brendan Graham
CNR Music singles
Songs about nostalgia
Songs about rock music
Songs about old age